The Neustraße/Nieuwstraat is a road that is both in the German town of Herzogenrath and in the Dutch town of Kerkrade.

Streets in Germany
Streets in the Netherlands
Geography of Limburg (Netherlands)
Transport in Kerkrade
Aachen (district)